is an amusement park in Fujiyoshida, Yamanashi, Japan, owned and operated by the namesake Fuji Kyuko Co. it was opened on 2 March 1968.

The theme park is near the base of Mount Fuji.  It has a number of roller coasters, as well as two haunted attractions: the Haunted Hospital, the world's first and largest haunted attraction and the newly built Hopeless Fortress. Other attractions include Thomas Land, a children's area with a Thomas the Tank Engine theme and attractions themed to Mobile Suit Gundam, Hamtaro and Neon Genesis Evangelion.

Attractions

Roller coasters
Fuji-Q's most famous roller coasters are the following:

Fujiyama, 79 metres tall, 130 km/h, opened in 1996 and was once the world's tallest roller coaster. As of 2022 it is the world's 3rd longest, and 11th tallest roller coaster.
Do-Dodonpa, 49 metres tall, 180 km/h, opened in 2001 and formerly the world's fastest roller coaster. Originally opened as Dodonpa with an original top speed of 172km/h, although it was renovated and reopened in 2017 with a new name and increased top speed of 180km/h. As of 2022, it is the 3rd fastest roller coaster in the world, although it still holds the record for the fastest launch acceleration. (Closed indefinitely as of August 2021)
Eejanaika, 76 metres tall, 126 km/h, opened in 2006 and is only the second "4th Dimension roller coaster" ever built (the first being X² at Six Flags Magic Mountain in California, US). As a "4th dimension" roller coaster its seats can rotate 360 degrees forward or backward in a controlled spin, thus allowing Eejanaika to invert 14 different times, even though the actual track inverts only three times. It surpasses the first built "4th dimension" roller coaster, X², in both height and speed.
Takabisha, 43 metres tall, 100 km/h, opened on 16 July 2011. Contains a 121° freefall, as well as seven major inversions over 1000 metres of track.  Formerly the world's steepest roller coaster, until the opening of TMNT Shellraiser in 2019.

Other Rides
Tentekomai - Gerstlauer Sky Roller
Steel Chief - Zamperla Sky Flyer
Tondemina - Huss Giant Frisbee
Red Tower - S&S Space Shot
Panic Clock - Vekoma Air Jumper
Nagashimasuka - Hafema River Rapid Ride

Incidents

2020–2021 Do-Dodonpa safety complaints
From December 2020 to August 2021, at least 6 visitors were injured while riding the Do-Dodonpa roller coaster. Today, the attraction in question is closed for safety checks.

In popular culture
In 2006, on the 9th Season of The Amazing Race, the final 3 teams came here and rode Tondemina, Dodonpa and Fujiyama while looking for a clue to their next destination.

Bus terminal

Highway buses 
 Chūō Kōsoku Bus; For Shinjuku Station
 For Futako-Tamagawa Station and Shibuya Station
 For Ichigao Station and Tokyo Station
 For Tokyo Station (Tekko Building)
 For Haneda Airport
 For Seiseki-sakuragaoka Station, Tama-Center Station, and Minami-ōsawa Station
 For Hashimoto Station and Machida Station
 For Tama-Plaza Station and Center-Kita Station
 Lake Liner; For Ayase and Yokohama Station
 For Hon-Atsugi Station, Tsujidō Station, and Fujisawa Station
 Highland Liner; For Shin-Matsuda Station and Kōzu Station
 For Nishi-Funabashi Station, Tsudanuma Station, Keisei Tsudanuma Station, and Kaihimmakuhari Station
 For Ikebukuro Station and Ōmiya Station
 For Sayama, Kawagoe Station, and Omiya Station
 For Takasaki Station, Maebashi Station, and Shibukawa Station
 For Mishima Station
 For Shimizu Station and Shizuoka Station
 For Matsumoto Bus Terminal (Matsumoto Station)
 Resort Express; For Hoshigaoka Station and Nagoya Station
 Fujiyama Liner; For Kyōto Station, Ōsaka Station, and Ōsaka Abenobashi Station
 For Fukui Station, Komatsu Station, and Kanazawa Station
 Hakata Fujiyama Express; For Kokura Station, Nishitetsu Fukuoka (Tenjin) Station, and Hakata Station

References

External links

Fuji-Q Highland homepage (English, unreliable machine-translated text)
Fuji-Q Highland at the Roller Coaster DataBase
Fuji-Q Highland on CoasterGallery.com

 
Amusement parks in Japan
Tourist attractions in Yamanashi Prefecture
Buildings and structures in Yamanashi Prefecture
1968 establishments in Japan
Amusement parks opened in 1968
Fujiyoshida